About Time may refer to:

Film and television 
 About Time (1962 film), a film in the Bell Laboratory Science Series
 About Time (2013 film), a British romantic time travel film
 About Time (TV series), a 2018 South Korean television series
 About Time, a series of episode guides to the TV series Doctor Who, by Lawrence Miles and Tat Wood

Albums 
 About Time (Angel album), 2013
 About Time (New York Gong album), 1979
 About Time (Paul Bley album), 2008
 About Time (Pennywise album), 1995
 About Time (Sabrina Claudio album), 2017
 About Time (Steve Winwood album), 2003
 About Time (The Stranglers album), 1995
 About Time (Ten Years After album), 1989
 About Time, by Five Fingers of Funk, 1998
 About Time, by Tony Cox and Steve Newman, 2002
 About Time, an EP by Straylight Run, 2009

Other media 
 About Time (board game), a general knowledge historical board game
 About Time (book), a 1996 book by Paul Davies
 About Time (play), a 1990 play by Tom Cole

See also 
 Bout Time", a song from the film musical The One and Only, Genuine, Original Family Band
 It's About Time (disambiguation)